Brian R. Martinotti (born February 2, 1961) is a United States district judge of the United States District Court for the District of New Jersey and a former New Jersey state judge.

Biography

Martinotti was born in 1961 and received a Bachelor of Science degree in 1983 from Fordham University. He received a Juris Doctor, cum laude, in 1986 from Seton Hall University School of Law. He began his legal career by serving as a law clerk to Judge Roger M. Kahn of the New Jersey Tax Court. From 1987 to 2002, he served at the law firm of Beattie Padovano, LLC., and was elevated to partner in 1994. Concurrently with his private practice, he served as a council member for the Borough of Cliffside Park and also served other towns in various roles as municipal public defender, prosecutor and tax attorney. From 2002–2016, he served as a Judge of the Superior Court of New Jersey, where he served in the civil division and was one of the state's three multi-county litigation judges handling mass torts. During his tenure on the state bench, he was assigned to preside over the special environmental, affordable housing and family law dockets.

Personal

Martinotti married the former Dana M. Licameli, a grade school teacher, on March 23, 1991 in a Roman Catholic ceremony.

Federal judicial service

On June 11, 2015, President Barack Obama nominated Martinotti to serve as a United States District Judge of the United States District Court for the District of New Jersey, to the seat being vacated by Judge Stanley R. Chesler, who assumed senior status on June 15, 2015. He received a hearing before the Judiciary Committee on September 30, 2015. On October 29, 2015 his nomination was reported out of committee by a voice vote. On July 6, 2016 the United States Senate confirmed his nomination by a 92–5 vote. He received his judicial commission on July 11, 2016. Martinotti was the last Obama-appointed judge to be confirmed.

References

External links

1961 births
Living people
American people of Italian descent
Fordham University alumni
Judges of the United States District Court for the District of New Jersey
New Jersey lawyers
New Jersey state court judges
People from Englewood, New Jersey
Seton Hall University School of Law alumni
Superior court judges in the United States
United States district court judges appointed by Barack Obama
21st-century American judges
Catholics from New Jersey
Public defenders